Crown College is a independent Baptist Bible college, trade school, seminary, language school, and music conservatory in Powell, Tennessee.

History 
Clarence Sexton founded Crown College in 1991.  The faculty and students of Crown College agree to uphold the Crown Code, Crown's philosophy of education, and their statement of faith, all of which are based on the Bible.

Crown College is nationally accredited by the Transnational Association of Christian Colleges and Schools.  Crown College is also authorized for operation as a postsecondary educational institution by the Tennessee Higher Education Commission.

Crown College is home to the one-of-a-kind Crown Christian Heritage Center. This center encompasses 30,000 sq. ft. within the main campus and includes hundreds of displays highlighting the lives of Christian men and women who contributed greatly to the cause of Christ.

Academics

The college offers the Bachelor of Biblical Studies degree, with concentrations in pastoral ministry, youth ministry, missions, music ministry,  Christian education, business, trades and technology, a Christian Life Certificate, and opportunities for individual study through online programs, the school of International Language Navigators, and the Crown Music Conservatory. The Crown Seminary offers the M.C.E., M.S.M., M.Min., M.B.S., and M.Div. degrees.  The college also has an auxiliary campus in Birmingham, England.

Student life
The main campus in Powell was formerly a Levi Strauss manufacturing plant that was extensively renovated for use as a college. The new campus employs the neo-classical architectural design. Located on this campus are classrooms, the Crown Bookshop, the Crown Music Conservatory,  the Lee Roberson Christian Heritage Center, the Great Hall dining area, and the campus library. Student housing is available on the campus of Temple Baptist Church and at the North Campus just a few miles away.

The Crown College is a member of the United States Collegiate Athletic Association (USCAA) Division II, and fields teams in men's basketball, men's soccer, and women's volleyball. The Crown College Choir  is a signature of the college, having performed across the United States and the United Kingdom.

The Crown College is affiliated with three summer camps: Mount Moriah Christian Camp in Powell, TN, Lake Texoma Baptist Youth Camp in Pottsboro, TX, and Camp Victory near Birmingham, England.

Crown Christian Publications
Crown Christian Publications is based in The Crown College, and is a ministry of Temple Baptist Church in Powell. Crown Christian Publications is a small publisher that specializes in books on Christian living and devotionals. Many of the books are written by the college's president, Dr. Clarence Sexton.

Notes

External links
 Crown College (Official Site)
 Temple Baptist Church
 Faith for the Family
 Crown Christian Publications

Independent Baptist universities and colleges in the United States
Baptist Christianity in Tennessee
Seminaries and theological colleges in Tennessee
Education in Knox County, Tennessee
Knoxville metropolitan area
Bible colleges
Educational institutions established in 1991
Buildings and structures in Knox County, Tennessee
1991 establishments in Tennessee
Transnational Association of Christian Colleges and Schools